Clark Stith (born May 19, 1961) is an American politician and a Republican member of the Wyoming House of Representatives representing District 48 since June 5, 2017.

Career
Prior to his elevation to the Wyoming House of Representatives, Stith was Chairman of the Sweetwater County Republican Party.  He was elected to the Rock Springs City Council in 2012 to replace retiring City Councilor Joyce Corcoran and was reelected in 2016.  Stith resigned from the City Council after moving out of the ward.

Stith has practiced law in Rock Springs since 1997.

Elections

2000
Stith challenged incumbent Democratic State Senator Rae Lynn Job in the general election, having won the Republican nomination unopposed.  Job defeated Stith with 55.6% of the vote.

2002
After incumbent Democratic State Representative Bud Nelson announced his retirement, Stith announced his candidacy for House District 48.  Stith won the Republican primary unopposed, and faced former Rock Springs City Councilman Marty Martin in the general election.  Martin defeated Stith with 55.1% of the vote.

2008
Stith challenged incumbent Democratic State Representative Bernadine Craft in the general election, having won the Republican nomination for House District 17 unopposed.  Craft defeated Stith with 53.8% of the vote.

2012
When incumbent Republican State Treasurer Joe Meyer died, Stith was one of three finalists submitted to Governor Matt Mead as Meyer's replacement.  Rancher and former Congressional candidate Mark Gordon was ultimately appointed to the position.

2014
After incumbent Republican Secretary of State Max Maxfield announced his retirement, Stith announced his candidacy, becoming the second Republican to enter the race behind State Representative Dan Zwonitzer who later withdrew.  Stith faced former Speaker of the Wyoming House of Representatives Ed Buchanan, former State Representative Pete Illoway, and businessman Ed Murray in the Republican primary.  Stith placed last in the primary, having won only 8.6% of the vote.

2017
Stith was appointed by the Sweetwater County Commission to fill the vacancy in House District 48 after incumbent Republican Representative Mark Baker resigned, having moved out of the district.

References

1961 births
21st-century American politicians
Georgetown University Law Center alumni
Living people
People from Rock Springs, Wyoming
Republican Party members of the Wyoming House of Representatives
Wyoming city council members